Agapur is a village in Begusarai district, in the state of Bihar, India.

Demographics
The village is home to 3338 people, among them 1738 (52%) are male and 1600 (48%) are female. 46% of the whole population are from general caste, 54% are from schedule caste. The child (aged under 6 years) population of Agapur village is 20%, among them 52% are boys and 48% are girls. There are 670 households in the village.

Transport

Roadways

Dalsinghsarai is one of the nearby towns that have road connectivity to Agapur.

Railways

Bachwara Jn Railway Station and Fateha Railway Station are the nearest railway stations. Dalsingh Sarai Railway Station (near Dalsinghsarai), and Sathajagat Railway Station (also near Dalsinghsarai) are the railway stations reachable from near by towns. Barauni Jn Rail Way Station is major railway station is 19 km away.

Climate
The average highest summer day temperature is between 29 °C and 45 °C. 
Average temperatures of January are 16 °C to 18 °C

February 20 °C to 25 °C

March 26 °C to 28 °C

April 32 °C to 35 °C

May 35 °C to 40 °C.

Education
 
Middle School Agapur

Primary School Agapur
 
T P C High School Nayatol Agapur

References

Villages in Begusarai district